Duagh is a  village in County Kerry, Ireland, located approximately 9 km southeast of Listowel and 7 km northwest of Abbeyfeale on the R555 regional road.

Duagh is a dormitory village for Listowel and Abbeyfeale and a local service centre for the rural hinterland. There is one shop, three public houses, two housing estates, a hardware store and petrol station/shop which are located on the village’s only street at the centre of the village. Social facilities include a church and heritage/community hall and a Gaelic Athletic Association Club located at the centre of the village. The local primary school is also located in the village centre.

Population
The population of the Duagh Electoral Division increased during the intercensal period 1996-2002. In 2002 the population was recorded as 469 persons (CSO). This equates to an increase of 4.5%. Preliminary figures for the 2006 census show this increase slowing to 3%. 

In 1837 the village had a population of 210. As of the 2016 census, the village had 222 inhabitants.

Education
Duagh National School is a mixed school with 175 pupils. The original school was built in 1876.

Sport
The village is home to Duagh GAA club which owns  of a playing field.

Duagh's first county championship came in 2002 when they won the Kerry Novice Football Championship.  In 2006 they won the Kerry Junior Football Championship, and went on to win the Munster Junior Club Football Championship.  Duagh then reached the All-Ireland Junior Club Football Championship final, but lost by a single point to Greencastle of County Tyrone in Croke Park. Duagh players who have formerly played with Kerry's senior county panel include Anthony Maher, JJ Costelloe, Dan McCaulliffe and Des Dillon. Duagh GAA club won the North Kerry Football 2012 Championship final beating Beale GAA club. This was their first win in 50 years.

Media
The village and its surrounding area were used as one of the filming locations for the Game of Thrones series. This included some of the wooded scenes from season 1 and 2.

See also
 List of towns and villages in Ireland

References

Towns and villages in County Kerry
Articles on towns and villages in Ireland possibly missing Irish place names